Ted or Teddy Davis may refer to:

Ted Davis (American football) (1942–2019), American college and National Football League player
Ted Davis (footballer) (1892–?), British goalkeeper
Ted Davis (sportscaster), American radio announcer
Ted Davis Jr. (born 1950), American politician in the North Carolina House of Representatives
Teddy Davis (1923–1966), American featherweight boxer
H. Ted Davis (1937–2009), American professor and engineer

See also
Edward Davis (disambiguation)
Theodore Davis (disambiguation)